Zhang Chutong (张楚桐 born 17 February 2003) is a Chinese short track speed skater. She competed at the 2022 Winter Olympics, in Women's 3000 metre relay, winning a bronze medal.

She competed at the 2020 Winter Youth Olympics.

References

External links

2003 births
Living people
Chinese female short track speed skaters
Four Continents Short Track Speed Skating Championships medalists
Medalists at the 2022 Winter Olympics
Olympic medalists in short track speed skating
Olympic short track speed skaters of China
Olympic gold medalists for China
Olympic bronze medalists for China
Short track speed skaters at the 2020 Winter Youth Olympics
Short track speed skaters at the 2022 Winter Olympics
21st-century Chinese women